Paige Hourigan and Astra Sharma were the defending champions having won the previous edition in 2019, however both players chose not to participate.

Kaitlyn Christian and Lidziya Marozava won the title, defeating Anastasia Tikhonova and Daniela Vismane in the final, 6–0, 6–2.

Seeds

Draw

Draw

References
Main Draw

Guanajuato Open - Doubles